The Antarctica Schmidt Telescopes project (also known as Antarctic Survey Telescopes (AST3)) is a joint project between Texas A&M University (TAMU) and the Beijing Astronomical Observatory to build three small (50cm aperture) wide-field telescopes at the Antarctic Kunlun Station near Dome A in Antarctica; Lifan Wang at TAMU is the main instigator of the project. 

These telescopes will take advantage of the low background and the long Antarctic nights to provide high-accuracy photometric time series for finding extrasolar planets, and to observe wide fields in the infrared to look for new supernovae.

The first of three Antarctic Survey Telescopes AST3-1, was installed at the Antarctic Kunlun Station in April 2012. 2nd and 3rd telescopes will be installed in 2013 and 2014 

An update was published indicating that the first telescope operated for only a few weeks in 2012 before a power failure, and was repaired in 2013, but the CCD controller proceeded to fail after further data collection.  The AST3-2 unit has seen several design revisions to improve reliability in the harsh Antarctic environment, and was tested over the 2013-2014 winter in Mohe, China before being sent to the field.

See also
 List of astronomical observatories
 Lists of telescopes

References 

Optical telescopes
Astronomical telescopes and observatories in the Antarctic
2012 establishments in Antarctica